Leon Vivian Garrick (born 11 November 1976) is a West Indian cricketer who played one Test and three One Day Internationals in 2001.

Garrick was born in Saint Ann, Jamaica, and played for the Jamaican youth side before making his first-class debut in 1997, where he made successive centuries. Garrick learned his craft under the guidance of Derrick Azan at the Garvey Maceo High School in Jamaica, an institution renowned for its excellence in School boy cricket in Jamaica, having produced Laurie Williams, Keith Hibbert and Audley Sanson. 

Garrick has played for Middlesex and Kaiser Sports Club in the Jamaica County Competition. A good batsman who was comfortable playing any type of bowling, Garrick also kept wicket at times throughout his career.

Garrick has the record for the largest opening partnership for Jamaica; an unbeaten 425 with Chris Gayle.

References

1976 births
Living people
People from Saint Ann Parish
Jamaican cricketers
West Indies One Day International cricketers
West Indies Test cricketers
Cricketers at the 1998 Commonwealth Games
Commonwealth Games competitors for Jamaica
Jamaica cricketers